Mikhail Yevgenyevich Porechenkov (born 2 March 1969, in Leningrad, Soviet Union) is a Russian film actor, producer, director. He became famous after his lead role as FSB Agent Alexey Nikolayev in the TV series National Security Agent (1999–2005). In 2008, Porechenkov produced, directed and starred in D-Day (День Д), a Russian remake of the 1985 American action film Commando.

Biography
Porechenkov was born in Leningrad to parents Yevgeny Mikhailovich Porechenkov and Galina Nikolayevna Porechenkova. His father was a Soviet Navy officer, and his mother was a building engineer. Since his parents were busy at work, he, in general, was raised until the age of 5 by his grandmother in a village of Pskov Oblast, and then, before going to school, he returned to Leningrad. In the late 1970s, his father was appointed as an inspector of the Polish Gdańsk Shipyard, where Soviet ships were built, thus, in the first years of schooling, Porechenkov had to leave Leningrad and move, along with his family, to the Polish People's Republic. There, he began to study in a Soviet Embassy boarding school in Warsaw. During the education period, he became interested in sports, especially boxing. After graduating from school in 1986, he went to the Estonian SSR, where he entered the Tallinn Higher Military-Political Construction School to earn a political officer degree. Despite sporting achievements—Porechenkov earned the rank of the Candidate for Master of Sport in Boxing after his successful performance at the college championship and municipal tournament in Tallinn, he was dismissed from the college in 1990, just 10 days before his graduation. When he returned home from Estonia, he worked in a picture framing studio, and attended Armen Dzhigarkhanyan's class in the Gerasimov Institute of Cinematography (VGIK), which he did not graduate from. In 1991 he entered the Leningrad State Institute of Theatre, Music and Cinematography (LGITMiK), Veniamin Filshtinsky's class, and graduated in 1996.

Controversy
In October 2014, Porechenkov was wanted by Ukrainian authorities for allegedly engaging in terrorist activities in Donetsk. Porechenkov was filmed firing a heavy weapon whilst visiting fighters besieging Donetsk International Airport and wearing protective clothing with 'Press' markings. Ukrainian officials said they would charge him with "participation in terrorist activities of the so-called DNR" and participation in activities of "armed gangs." Since 2015 Porechenkov is banned from entering Ukraine.

Awards and nominations

Awards 
 Golden Mask, 1996 – for the role of Pozzo in Yuri Butusov's play Waiting for Godot
 Golden Sofit, ????
 Sozvezdie, ????
 Vladislav Strzhelchik Prize, 1999 – Ensemble cast (Yuri Butusov's play Waiting for Godot)
 FSP Prize, 2008 - Acting Work (for the lead role in TV series Liquidation and the creation of Russian officer characters in other films)
 Oleg Tabakov Prize, 2009 (for the lead role in Anton Yakovlev's play The Kreutzer Sonata)

Nominations 
 Golden Eagle Award, 2006 – Best Leading Actor (The 9th Company)
 Golden Eagle Award, 2006 – Best Supporting Actor (Soldier's Decameron)
 Nika Award, 2006 – Best Supporting Actor (The 9th Company)
 MTV Russia Movie Awards, 2006 – Best Male Performance (The 9th Company)
 MTV Russia Movie Awards, 2007 – Best Kiss (Svyaz)
 Golden Eagle Award, 2009 – Best TV Actor (Liquidation)
 MTV Russia Movie Awards, 2009 – Best Male Performance (Realnyy papa)
 MTV Russia Movie Awards, 2009 – Best Comedic Performance (Realnyy papa)
 Georges Awards, 2015 – Russian Actor of the Year (Poddubny)
 Georges Awards, 2015 – Russian Hero of the Year (Poddubny)

Filmography

Film

 Koleso lyubvi (1994)
 Telo kapitana budet predano zemle, a starshiy michman budet pet (1998)
 Women's Property (1999)
 National Security Agent (1999)
 Gangster Petersburg: Baron (2000) - Maks
 Peculiarities of the National Hunt in Winter Season (2000)
 Mechanical Suite (2002) - Mityagin
 Vovochka (2002) - Lt. Grigori Pinduzhin
 Dnevnik kamikadze (2003)
 Trio (2003) - Alexei
 Peculiarities of National Politics (2003) - Vanya
 Tayna volchey pasti (2004)
 Soldatskiy dekameron (2005) - Panteleyev
 The 9th Company (2005) - Aleksandr Dygalo
 Bolshaya lyubov (2006) - Anton Ulybabov
 Svyaz (2006) - Ilya
 Zhara (2006) - Mikhail Porechenkov
 The Great Love (2006)
 1612 (2007) - Prince Dmitri Pozharsky 
 Realnyy papa (2008)
 D-Day (2008) - Ivan
 The New Year's Rate Plan (2008) - Barinov
 Na kryshe mira (2008) - Vassili
 Dr. Tyrsa (2010)
 Without Men (2010)

 Counter-Game (2011)
 Fairytale.Is (2011) - The Bear
 The Marathon (2013)
 Iron Ivan (2014) - Ivan Poddubny
 The Shadow (2017)

TV
 Spetsnaz (2002) - Wallens
 Lines of Fate (2003) - Igor
 The Fall of the Empire (2006) - Ensign with white flag
 The Storm Gate (2006) - Maj. Egorov
 Deadly Force (2006) - Nikita Uvarov
 Liquidation (2007) - Krechetov Vitaly
 Isaev (2009) - Graf Vorontsov
 Heavenly Court (2011-2014) - Veniamin
 The White Guard (2012)
 Crisis (2014, Episode 8: "How Far Would You Go") -Victor Vries
 The Bridge (2017)
 Trotsky (2017) - Alexander Parvus

References

External links

 

1969 births
20th-century Russian male actors
21st-century Russian male actors
Living people
Russian State Institute of Performing Arts alumni
Male actors from Saint Petersburg
Honored Artists of the Russian Federation
People's Artists of Russia
Anti-Ukrainian sentiment in Russia
Censorship in Ukraine
Pro-Russian people of the war in Donbas
Pro-Russian people of the 2014 pro-Russian unrest in Ukraine
Russian film directors
Russian male film actors
Russian male stage actors
Russian television presenters